The River Roe is a river located in County Londonderry, Northern Ireland. It flows north from Glenshane in the Sperrin Mountains to Lough Foyle, via the settlements of Dungiven, Burnfoot, Limavady and Myroe. 
The River Roe's length is

Origin 
The origin of the name 'Roe' is unclear. Suggestions include a Viking origin in the 8th/9th century, and the Irish 'rua', meaning 'red', i.e. the Red River. This may be a reference to the high amounts of iron found in some places along the river.

This roughly translates into English as "The River of Rowing", possibly due to common passage by oar-powered boat craft in earlier times.

Geology
The Roe Basin (or Roe Valley) is a wide, glacial valley. The river flows most of the way to Limavady through an open, grassy, pastoral farmland landscape before narrowing through a metamorphic rock gorge within the Roe Valley Country Park. Beyond Limavady the river widens and meanders to an estuary feeding into Lough Foyle at Myroe Levels. Due to the wide, open nature of the upper reaches of the Roe, heavy rainfall can result in large surges of water or floods. Many lower lying fields have earth defences to prevent flooding when the river rises above its natural banks. The estuary is a feeding ground of many birds and nesting area for lapwing.

Angling
The Roe Valley Country Park is a popular area for fishing, with stock of salmon, sea trout and brown trout.

See also
Rivers of Ireland

References

External links
The name of the river Roe
Salmon fishing on the River Roe, from Salmon Ireland

Roe